August Sothley "Augie" Walsh (August 17, 1904 – November 12, 1985) was an American professional baseball pitcher. In 39 career games, he had a 4–10 record with a 6.05 ERA. He batted and threw right-handed.

Walsh was born in Wilmington, Delaware, and died in San Rafael, California.

External links

1904 births
1985 deaths
Philadelphia Phillies players
Baseball players from Wilmington, Delaware